Gateways to Annihilation is the sixth studio album by the death metal band Morbid Angel.

This album saw a change in musical style as the speed-laden intensity of the previous album Formulas Fatal to the Flesh was abandoned for a slower, more droning style, reminiscent of Blessed Are the Sick. This is also the first album in which Steve Tucker contributed lyrics and music to the band. It is also the second and last album to feature Erik Rutan as a member of Morbid Angel.

Dan Seagrave painted the album cover. This marks the first Morbid Angel album cover he had painted since Altars of Madness.

The intro track name "Kawazu" is an archaic Japanese word meaning "frog", which explains the sounds of frogs croaking on the track.

Track listing

Personnel
Steve Tucker – bass, lead vocals
Trey Azagthoth – guitars, backing vocals, lead vocals on "Secured Limitations"
Erik Rutan – guitars, keyboards
Pete Sandoval – drums

References

Morbid Angel albums
2000 albums
Albums with cover art by Dan Seagrave
Earache Records albums